Liptena rubromacula is a butterfly in the family Lycaenidae. It is found in the Democratic Republic of the Congo, Uganda and Tanzania. The habitat consists of forests.

Subspecies
 Liptena rubromacula rubromacula (Democratic Republic of the Congo: North Kivu, Walikale and west of the Semliki)
 Liptena rubromacula jacksoni Carpenter, 1934 (Uganda: western shore of Lake Victoria, north-western Tanzania)

References

Butterflies described in 1933
Liptena